Mykola Hurovych Kulish (19 December 1892 – 3 November 1937) was a Ukrainian prose writer, playwright, pedagogue, veteran of World War I, and Red Army veteran. He is considered to be one of the lead figures of the Executed Renaissance.

Biography
Kulish was born in the village of Chaplynka, which in his letters he called Chaplyn. From age 9 he studied in a parish church and school. From 1905 Kulish studied at the Oleshky municipal eight-year school. Here he met with Ivan Dniprovsky. In 1908 he enrolled into the Oleshky pro-gymnasium which was closed down before he could graduate. During his school years he published several short verses and epigrams in students' hand-written magazines which gave him a certain degree of fame among his peers. In 1913 for the first time he writes a play At fish catching which later became the base for his comedy That was how perished Huska.

At 22 he enrolled in the Novorossiysk University Philology Department. However his education was interrupted again because of World War I as he was drafted into the Army. At first he served as a private in a reserve battalion. In 1914 he was sent to the Odessa school of praporshchiks (ensigns) after which he served at the front from 1915–1917. He continued to write short verses and small plays which were published in a military press-media. In 1917 already as an officer he chose the side of the February Revolution.

From the start of 1918 he was a head of Oleshky council of Workers' and Peasants' Deputies. In July 1919 in Kherson he organized the Dnipro Peasantry Regiment as part of RKKA. The regiment participated in the defense of Kherson and Mykolaiv from the forces of Anton Denikin. During the government of Hetman Pavlo Skoropadsky he was imprisoned for five months. After the return of the Red Army he was appointed as the chief of staff of Kherson and Dnipro uyezd Army groups.

After the demobilization in 1920 he worked as an instructor for several bodies of People's Education in Oleshky uyezd as well as edited the newspaper Chervony Shliakh in Zinovyevsk. During this time he putted together a Ukrainian alphabet Pervynka. He also started to tour around the southern Ukraine organizing various schools and helping the hungry during the famine of 1921–1922. He later wrote a two-part story about this in Russian, Po vesiam i selam.

In 1922 he worked in the governorate department of People's Education in Odessa as a school inspector. In 1924 Kulish wrote a play 97 where he described the famine of Kherson region in 1921–1922. Together with another play Commune in steppes (1925) his works were staged in Kharkiv and brought him a general recognition. In Odessa he joined the writers' society of Hart. In 1925 returned to Zinovyevsk where he edited Chervony Shliakh. Later that year he moved to Kharkiv where he met with various prominent Ukrainian writers and poets such as Mykola Khvyliovy, Ostap Vyshnia, Yuriy Yanovsky, Volodymyr Sosiura, and many others. Here Kulish became a member of VAPLITE and worked with theatrical group Berezil led by Les Kurbas.

In November 1926 he was elected as the president of VAPLITE until January 1928. Simultaneously with it Kulish was a member of the editorial collegiate of Chervony Shliakh. His works were published in the almanac Literary Fair. Since the end of 1929 Kulish was a member of presidium of a new literary union Politfront. Suddenly since 1930 all his fame was diminishing receiving all kinds of negative critical reviews. Kulish moved out of Kharkiv back to his native Kherson region. After the Holodomor of 1933 he grew more and more upset with the Soviet regime. During that time his plays Narodny Malakhiy, Myna Mazaylo, Pathetic sonata were recognized as hostile to the communist regime.

Repression and death

At the first  All-Union Congress of Soviet Writers in Moscow (17 August – 1 September 1934) Mykola Kulish was publicly denounced as a bourgeois-nationalist playwright. Particularly critical of him was Ivan Kulyk, who also mentioned the theatrical troop of Les Kurbas as one who performed Kulish's plays. 

In December 1934, after the burial of his friend Ivan Dniprovsky, Kulish was arrested by the agents of NKVD and sent to the Solovki prison camp in the White Sea. 

Kulish was one of the "lost transport" of prisoners shipped back to the mainland in 1937 from Solovki. It is now known that he was shot on 3 November with 289 other members of the Ukrainian intelligentsia at Sandarmokh near Medvezhyegorsk, Karelian ASSR. The site was discovered in 1997.

A few years after the death of Stalin in 1953, Kulish was posthumously declared innocent of the 1934 charges and  rehabilitated.

Works
 97
 Commune in steppes
 Farewell, village
 That was how Huska perished 
 Khuliy Khuryna
 Zone
 Nook (Zakut)
 Eternal mutiny
 Legend about Lenin
 Colonies
 Narodny Malakhiy
 Myna Mazaylo
 Sonata Pathétique
 Maklena Grasa
 Autobiography from a notebook

See also
Chervony Shliakh

References

External links
 Library of Ukrainian Literature
 Ukrainian center
 memorial.org.ua
 Librarian informational portal
 Island of knowledge
 Kharkiv Oblast Universal Library
 Internet Encyclopedia of Ukraine
 Dompavlov Travelling
 Kherson Oblast Library for children 
 Natalia Chukhontseva — artistic works about Mykola Kulish 
 Works of Mykola Kulish – E-Library Чтиво
 Works of Mykola Kulish on Lib.ru

Critical articles 
 Natalia Kuziakina — Mykola Kulish 
 Playwright depth of Mykola Kulish
 Yaroslav Holoborodko "Prosvita" in life and spiritual heritage of Mykola Kulish

1892 births
1937 deaths
People from Kherson Oblast
People from Dneprovsky Uyezd
Ukrainian educators
Ukrainian dramatists and playwrights
20th-century dramatists and playwrights
Russian military personnel of World War I
Soviet military personnel of the Russian Civil War
Great Purge victims from Ukraine
Soviet rehabilitations
People convicted in relations with the Organization of Ukrainian Nationalists